Scott Chadwick (born January 16, 1991) is a Canadian curler from Napanee, Ontario. He currently plays lead on Team John Epping. In 2021, he competed at the 2021 Canadian Olympic Curling Trials.

Career
While at Queen's University at Kingston, Chadwick won the 2010 CIS/CCA Curling Championships and placed fifth the following year at the 2011 Winter Universiade in Erzurum, Turkey. Chadwick would later team up with Greg Balsdon and capture the 2016 GSOC Tour Challenge Tier 2. In 2019, along with Scott McDonald, Jonathan Beuk and Wesley Forget, he represented Ontario at the 2019 Tim Hortons Brier where they finished with a 6–5 record. In 2021, while playing lead for Tanner Horgan, he finished second at the 2021 Canadian Olympic Curling Pre-Trials, earning a spot in the 2021 Canadian Olympic Curling Trials. There, Team Horgan finished in last place with a 1–7 record. Chadwick joined John Epping at the start of the 2022 season.

Personal
Chadwick works as a Shift Manager at Haakon Industries Inc. in Kingston Ontario. He attended Queen's University at Kingston.

References

External links

1991 births
Living people
People from Lennox and Addington County
Curlers from Ontario
Canadian male curlers
Queen's University at Kingston alumni
Competitors at the 2011 Winter Universiade